Coral Rapids station is a railway station in Coral Rapids, Ontario, on the Ontario Northland's Polar Bear Express.

External links
Polar Bear Express Service Map

Ontario Northland Railway stations
Railway stations in Cochrane District